Krutovo is a rural locality (a selo) in Novoselskoye Rural Settlement, Kovrovsky District, Vladimir Oblast, Russia. The population was 498 as of 2010. There are 6 streets.

Geography 
Krutovo is located on the Nerekhta River, 22 km south of Kovrov (the district's administrative centre) by road. Maryino is the nearest rural locality.

References 

Rural localities in Kovrovsky District